Kožlí is a municipality and village in Havlíčkův Brod District in the Vysočina Region of the Czech Republic. It has about 800 inhabitants.

Administrative parts
Villages of Bohumilice and Sechov are administrative parts of Kožlí.

References

Villages in Havlíčkův Brod District